Lukala Airport  is an airport serving the town of Lukala in Kongo Central Province, Democratic Republic of the Congo.

See also

Transport in the Democratic Republic of the Congo
List of airports in the Democratic Republic of the Congo

References

External links
OpenStreetMap - Lukala
 FallingRain - Lukala
 HERE Maps - Lukala
 OurAirports - Lukala

Airports in Kongo Central Province